|}

The Somerville Tattersall Stakes, currently run as the Tattersalls Stakes, is a Group 3 flat horse race in Great Britain open to two-year-old colts and geldings. It is run on the Rowley Mile at Newmarket over a distance of 7 furlongs (1,408 metres), and it is scheduled to take place each year in late September.

History
The event is named after Edmund Somerville Tattersall (1863–1942), a senior partner of Tattersalls bloodstock auctioneers.

The race was formerly classed at Listed level, and it used to be open to horses of either gender. It was promoted to Group 3 status in 2000.

The Somerville Tattersall Stakes is currently held on the opening day of Newmarket's three-day Cambridgeshire Meeting. It is run two days before the Cambridgeshire Handicap.

The leading contenders sometimes go on to compete in the Dewhurst Stakes or the Racing Post Trophy.

Records

Leading jockey since 1962 (6 wins):
 Pat Eddery – Don Comiso (1977), Borderline (1978), Damister (1984), Tertian (1991), Grand Lodge (1993), Milk It Mick (2003)

Leading trainer since 1962 (5 wins):
 Henry Cecil – Polished Silver (1982), Salse (1987), Opening Verse (1988), Peter Davies (1990), Enrique (1998)

Winners since 1977

Earlier winners

 1962: Portofino
 1963: Roan Rocket
 1964: Goupi
 1965: Double-U-Jay
 1966: Paddykin
 1967: Virginia Gentleman
 1968: Zarco
 1969: Smokey Rocket
 1970: Banco Divin
 1971: Coup de Feu
 1972: Silver Birch
 1973: Spanish Warrior
 1974: Escapologist
 1975: Seadiver
 1976: Princess Tiara

See also
 Horse racing in Great Britain
 List of British flat horse races

References
 Paris-Turf: 
 Racing Post:

 galopp-sieger.de – Somerville Tattersall Stakes.
 horseracingintfed.com – International Federation of Horseracing Authorities – Somerville Tattersall Stakes (2018).
 pedigreequery.com – Somerville Tattersall Stakes – Newmarket.

Flat races in Great Britain
Newmarket Racecourse
Flat horse races for two-year-olds